Yevgeni Fofanov (born July 16, 1989) is Russian professional ice hockey winger. He is currently a free agent having last played for IPK in Mestis.

Despite being Russian, Fofanov has to date spent his entire career in Finland. He began his career with Hokki in their junior setup in 2004 and made his debut for the senior team during the 2010–11 Mestis season. On September 11, 2014, he joined IPK of the Suomi-sarja, who were then promoted to Mestis two years later. He was released on September 9, 2019.

References

External links

1989 births
Living people
Hokki players
Iisalmen Peli-Karhut players
Russian ice hockey forwards
Ice hockey people from Moscow